Tragocephala mniszechii is a species of beetle in the family Cerambycidae. It was described by James Thomson in 1857. It has a wide distribution in Africa.

Varietas
 Tragocephala mniszechii var. blutelii Buquet, 1857
 Tragocephala mniszechii var. klugii Thomson, 1878
 Tragocephala mniszechii var. basalis Jordan, 1894
 Tragocephala mniszechii var. occidentalis Jordan, 1894
 Tragocephala mniszechii var. timida Duvivier, 1892

References

mniszechii
Beetles described in 1857